Jean Lalemand (born 11 September 1912, date of death unknown) was a Belgian wrestler. He competed in the men's freestyle lightweight at the 1936 Summer Olympics.

References

External links
 

1912 births
Year of death missing
Belgian male sport wrestlers
Olympic wrestlers of Belgium
Wrestlers at the 1936 Summer Olympics
Place of birth missing